Stereocaulon incrustatum is a species of snow lichen belonging to the family Stereocaulaceae, which is typically found on its stems and can produce galls.

Forms and varieties:
 Stereocaulon incrustatum f. gracile
 Stereocaulon incrustatum f. gracilis
 Stereocaulon incrustatum f. incrustatum
 Stereocaulon incrustatum var. abduanum
 Stereocaulon incrustatum var. elaturn
 Stereocaulon incrustatum var. incrustatum

Ecology
Stereocaulon incrustatum is a known host to the lichenicolous fungus species Rhymbocarpus stereocaulorum.

References

Stereocaulaceae
Lichen species
Lichens described in 1819
Taxa named by Heinrich Gustav Flörke